Joseph Young Cadden (13 April 1920 – 5 June 1981) was a Scottish professional footballer who played as a central defender in the Football League.

References

Sources

1920 births
1981 deaths
Footballers from Glasgow
Scottish footballers
Liverpool F.C. players
Grimsby Town F.C. players
Accrington Stanley F.C. (1891) players
New Brighton A.F.C. players
English Football League players
Association football central defenders
Dumbarton F.C. players